The 1995 San Diego Padres season was the 27th season in franchise history.

Offseason
 November 3, 1994: Rico Rossy was signed as a free agent by the Padres.
 November 28, 1994: Wally Whitehurst was released by the Padres.
 December 28, 1994: Derek Bell, Doug Brocail, Ricky Gutiérrez, Pedro Martínez, Phil Plantier, and Craig Shipley were traded by the Padres to the Houston Astros for Ken Caminiti, Andújar Cedeño, Steve Finley, Roberto Petagine, and Brian Williams and a player to be named later. The Astros completed the deal by sending Sean Fesh (minors) to the Padres on May 1, 1995.

Regular season

Opening Day starters
Brad Ausmus
Andy Benes
Ken Caminiti
Andújar Cedeño
Steve Finley
Tony Gwynn
Jody Reed
Bip Roberts
Eddie Williams

Season standings

Record vs. opponents

Notable transactions
 April 5, 1995: Fernando Valenzuela was signed as a free agent by the Padres.
May 31, 1995: Wascar Serrano was signed by the San Diego Padres as an amateur free agent.
 June 30, 1995: Greg Cadaret was signed as a free agent by the Padres.
 July 19, 1995: Rich Loiselle and Jeff Tabaka was traded by the Padres to the Houston Astros for Phil Plantier.
 July 31, 1995: Andy Benes and a player to be named later were traded by the Padres to the Seattle Mariners for Marc Newfield and Ron Villone. The Padres completed the deal by sending Greg Keagle to the Mariners on September 17.

Roster

Player stats

Batting

Starters by position
Note: Pos = Position; G = Games played; AB = At bats; H = Hits; Avg. = Batting average; HR = Home runs; RBI = Runs batted in

Other batters
Note: G = Games played; AB = At bats; H = Hits; Avg. = Batting average; HR = Home runs; RBI = Runs batted in

Pitching

Starting pitchers
Note: G = Games pitched; IP = Innings pitched; W = Wins; L = Losses; ERA = Earned run average; SO = Strikeouts

Other pitchers
Note: G = Games pitched; IP = Innings pitched; W = Wins; L = Losses; ERA = Earned run average; SO = Strikeouts

Relief pitchers
Note: G = Games pitched; W = Wins; L = Losses; SV = Saves; ERA = Earned run average; SO = Strikeouts

Award winners

1995 Major League Baseball All-Star Game
 Tony Gwynn, outfield, starter

Farm system

References

External links
 1995 San Diego Padres at Baseball Reference
 1995 San Diego Padres at Baseball Almanac
 

San Diego Padres seasons
San Diego Padres season
San Diego Padres